Tuxpam was a  suction hopper dredger which was built in 1944 by Lobnitz & Co Ltd, Renfrew. She was laid down as Mazatlan for the Mexican Government but was requisitioned by the Ministry of War Transport (MoWT) whilst under construction and launched as Empire Clydesdale. In 1946 she was transferred to the Mexican Government and renamed Tuxpam. She was scrapped in 1970.

Description
The ship was built by Lobnitz & Co Ltd, Renfrew, as yard number 966.

She had a GRT of 1,747 and a NRT of 839.

The engine was built by Lobnitz.

History
Empire Clydesdale was laid down as Mazatlan for the Mexican Government. She was requisitioned by the MoWT and launched as Empire Clydesdale. Her port of registry was Glasgow. The Code Letters MKPP and United Kingdom Official Number 169125 were allocated.

In 1946, Empire Clydesdale was transferred to the Secretario de Marina, Mexico and renamed Tuxpam. She served until 1970 when she was scrapped.

References

1944 ships
Ships built on the River Clyde
Dredgers
Steamships of the United Kingdom
Ministry of War Transport ships
Empire ships
Merchant ships of the United Kingdom
Steamships of Mexico
Merchant ships of Mexico